"Young and Foolish" is a popular song with music by Albert Hague and lyrics by Arnold B. Horwitt, published in 1954.

The song was introduced in the musical Plain and Fancy (1955–56), and has since been recorded by many singers since.

Recorded versions

Franck Amsallem
Paul Anka
Tony Bennett – for the album The Tony Bennett/Bill Evans Album (1975).
Eve Boswell
Sacha Distel
Jay Clayton
Bing Crosby recorded the song in 1955 for use on his radio show and it was subsequently included in the box set The Bing Crosby CBS Radio Recordings (1954–56) issued by Mosaic Records (catalog MD7-245) in 2009. 
Bill Evans – on his 1959 album Everybody Digs Bill Evans
The Four Preps
Lesley Gore
Gogi Grant – for her album Torch Time (1959).
Bill Henderson
Ronnie Hilton  – his cover version reached No. 17 on the UK Singles Chart in 1956.
Edmund Hockridge - this reached the No. 10 spot in the UK chart in 1956.
Richard "Groove" Holmes - for his 1973 album Night Glider
Nancy Kelly
The Lettermen
Gloria Lynne
Dean Martin- this briefly reached the No. 20 spot in the UK chart in 1956.
Johnny Mathis - for his album Love Is Everything (1965)
Chris McNulty
Brad Mehldau
Mark Murphy
Jackie Paris
Lucy Reed
Irene Reid
Tahna Running
Jo Stafford – a single release in 1955.
Laura Welland
Joe Williams
Nancy Wilson – for her album From Broadway with Love (1966).

References

1954 songs
1950s jazz standards